Wheelchair basketball at the 2017 ASEAN Para Games was held at Malaysian International Trade & Exhibition Centre (MITEC), Kuala Lumpur.

Medal summary

Medalists

See also
Basketball at the 2017 Southeast Asian Games

External links

2017 ASEAN Para Games
Wheelchair basketball at the ASEAN Para Games